is a railway station in Nagasaki, Nagasaki Prefecture, Japan, operated by the Kyushu Railway Company (JR Kyushu). It is the terminus of the Nishi Kyushu Shinkansen and the Nagasaki Main Line.

The station is connected by the Kamome Shinkansen service and the Relay Kamome limited express to Hakata, and by the Seaside Liner rapid service to Sasebo. Nagasaki Electric Tramway services call at a stop in front of the station.

Lines
 Nishi Kyushu Shinkansen
 Nagasaki Main Line

Station layout
The conventional line station has two elevated island platforms serving five tracks. The Shinkansen station has two island platforms serving four tracks.

Platforms

History
The station was opened on 5 April 1905 when the railway was extended from the former Nagasaki Station to the present station. The former station, opened in 1897, was renamed Urakami Station.

5 April 1905 - Opened by Kyushu Railway. 
1 July 1907 - The railways are nationalized and the station becomes part of Japanese Government Railways.
12 October 1909 – Japanese National Railways (JNR) renames the line the Nagasaki Main Line (長崎本線).
9 August 1945 – Station damaged in the atomic bombing of the city.
June 1969 – The elevated station is completed.
6 June 1976 – The track between Tosu and Nagasaki is electrified.
1 April 1987 – JNR is privatized and the station is inherited by JR Kyushu.
28 March 2020 - The station is rebuilt and is opened as a fully elevated station in preparation for the Nishi Kyushu Shinkansen
23 September 2022 - The station is serviced by the Nishi Kyushu Shinkansen with new Shinkansen platforms.

Surrounding area
 Nagasaki Electric Tramway Nagasaki-Ekimae tram stop
 Nagasaki Ken-ei Bus Terminal
 JR Kyushu Nagasaki Railway Division Nagasaki transportation center
 National Route 202
 Amu Plaza Nagasaki
 JR Kyushu Hotel Nagasaki
 Hotel New Nagasaki
 Nishi Kyushu Daiichi Hotel
 Twenty-six Martyrs of Japan
 NHK Nagasaki Broadcasting Station
 Nagasaki Chūō Post Office

Passenger statistics
In fiscal 2016, the station was used by an average of 10,650 passengers daily (boarding passengers only), and it ranked 13th among the busiest stations of JR Kyushu.

References

Railway stations in Nagasaki Prefecture
Buildings and structures in Nagasaki
Nagasaki Main Line
Railway stations in Japan opened in 1905